HNLMS Stier was a  monitor built in England for the Royal Netherlands Navy in the 1860s.

Design and description
The Schorpioen-class ships were designed to the same specification, but varied somewhat in details. They displaced  and was fitted with a ram bow. Their crew consisted of 110–136 officers and enlisted men.

Stier was powered by a pair of horizontal trunk steam engines, each driving a propeller shaft using steam from four square boilers. They were also equipped with two pole masts.

The Schorpioens were armed with a pair of Armstrong  rifled, muzzle-loading guns mounted in the gun turret. The gun turret was protected by  inches of armor and the armor thickness increased to  around the gun ports.

Notes

References

External links 
 

19th-century naval ships of the Netherlands
1868 ships
Schorpioen-class monitors
Ships built on the River Mersey